Dafydd (Daf) Palfrey (born 26 March 1973) is a Welsh director, producer and writer.

Education
He received 1st Class BA Hons Graphic Design at Camberwell College of Arts London Institute. His other interests include writing and performing music, which he has done semi-professionally since he was 16, as a lead guitarist with legendary Cardiff funk band Hanner Pei. He has written a pilot for a TV series, directed numerous prime time shows, shot over thirty music videos and worked in the UK and abroad, including the USA, Puerto Rico, Berlin, Patagonia and Canada.

Palfrey graduated in 1997 from Camberwell College of Arts with a 1st class degree in
Graphic Design. One of his graduation projects was a short film starring Rhys Ifans, which was a surrealist interpretation of the events leading up to "The Scream" by Edvard Munch.

He worked in Puerto Rico for a few months on a documentary about photographer Jack Delano. He directed music videos for a short time in London and Wales before moving to Bristol to work in TV and film. Credits include Historyonics for BBC One, Eating Words, music
videos for Super Furry Animals and DJ Yoda. To date, he has directed over 30 music videos, about 7 short films and a number of TV programmes. Some of those films he produced with his film production company "Ten Pence".

Credits
 2016, Director, "Fear Thy Neighbor" for Investigation Discovery
 2016, Director, "Murder U" 3 Episodes for Investigation Discovery
 2013, Director, Casualty Red Button Special "Scars and Nightmares" for BBC
 2012, Director, Gwaith/Cartref ("Homework") Series 3. 4 × 1 hour episodes for S4C – Episodes 2 to 5
 2011, Director, Sombreros Mini drama series for S4C. 3 × 1 hour episodes. Filmed in UK and Mallorca, Spain.
 2010, Director, Gwaith/Cartref ("Homework") Series 1. 7 hours of drama for S4C – Episodes 1 to 5 and 9 & 10
 2010, Director, 40" commercial for Western Power Distribution through Greenfield Media
 2009, Director, Crash, shown on BBC1 Series 2, Episode 4, 5 and 6 (final episodes)
 2008, Director, DIY SOS Compilation, shown on BBC1 on 7 January 2009
 2008, Director, Free Running, advertisement for UWIC
 2007 Writer-Director, "Poncho Mamgu" S4C/Tracrecord
 2006, Director, BBC (Bristol) DIY SOS. He directed 7 half-hour comedy based lifestyle programmes, averaging at 4.5 million viewers. A challenging mix of observational documentary, scripted comedy sequences and stylish design related elements.
 2006, Producer-Director, Ten Pence Ltd. DJ Yoda goes to the movies 2, DJ Yoda's second "Movies" set committed to DVD. Includes a special 45-minute performance in Greenwich Park on the influences of Quentin Tarrantino. Palfrey shot this entire DVD himself, and assembled it with the help of two editors and a multimedia company.
 2006, Director, Opus/S4C Cowbois ac Injans, 2 × 1 hour eight-part Comedy Drama series situated in a second-hand car dealership in the backwaters of West Wales. The series is a mix of drama, comedy and action which centres on the relationship between two rival salesmen and their chaotic lives.
 2006, Producer/Director, Ten Pence Ltd. DJ Yoda goes to the movies. He produced and directed a DVD of DJ Yoda's "Movies" set at the Curzon Soho in London. With the use of a DVD deck, two mixers, two turntables and a laptop, Yoda bombards the audience with clips from films, ranging from Star Wars to lesser known B-movies like "The Class of Nuke 'em High". He is able to 'scratch' these films, as you would a record. All this with a hip hop sound track.
 2006, Director, Boomerang Bandit Videos, Music videos shot on a mixture of Super16mm film and Digi Beta.
 2005, Director, Boomerang Bandit Videos, Entertaining music videos with mini budgets. "Dyn Telesales" by Mattoids voted best video of 2005 by members of http://maes-e.com
 2005, Director, Teledu Apollo "Teledu Eddie", Half-hour comedy for young viewers. A group of bizarre characters are stranded in the jungle as part of a cruel TV experiment, a bit like I'm a Celebrity... Get Me Out of Here!, but more anarchic.

 2005, Director, S4C, Bwyta Geiriau ("Eating Words"). Short comic drama on the enlargement of the European Union and its cultural impact on the UK. Nominated for Prix Europa 2005. Iona Jones (Director of Programming S4C) said about this film: "Bwyta Geiriau" typifies the creative excellence S4C aims for in all its output, with its unconventional, humorous take on the pan European issue of multilingualism.
 2005, Director, Apollo "Teledu Eddie" ("Eddie TV"), Half-hour comedy for young audience. Spoof on the "Holiday Swap" format.
 2004, Producer/Director, Ten Pence Limited, "Off the Lip" Aspects, Music video for Aspects, (Antidote/Sanctuary Records) summer surfing hip-hop anthem. Regular play on MTV2 and picked as a "Hot New One" on the NME Chart Show.
 2004, Writer/Director, Calling The Shots "Self Help For Your Nerves", Short film. Jane, a stressed-out mother of two, is confronted by a pernicious new age pedant in her introductory meditation class. BBC Three's "Late Night Shorts" Presented by Tim Roth.
 2004, Director, "With A Little Help From My Friends" – Vinnie Jones, Footballer and movie star Vinnie Jones builds a football club house with old school friends. He's only got five days in which to do it and no money. 1 hour. Transmitted at 6pm ITV1, Saturday evening. Jamie Theakston presents.
 2004, Director, "Boomerang i-DotDot", Documentary/entertainment. Behind the scenes of live studio show. Featured spoof dockumentary on resident band "The Perverts"

 2003, Director, BBC1, "Historyonics" (Mary Queen of Scots). The plot that led to Mary's execution. Script input and direction. Written and presented by Nick Knowles. Produced by Annie Heather.
 2003, Director, BBC1, "Historyonics" (1066), Comedy drama that builds up to the famous Battle of Hastings. Written and presented by Nick Knowles. The series was also shown on History Channel International.
 2003, Director, BBC1, "Historyonics" (Richard III). Uncovers the truth about Richard III of England and the rumours surrounding the murder of his nephews. Produced by Mark Bristow. Music by Louis Prima
 2002, Director, BBC, "Home Front in the Garden", Diarmuid Gavin's ambitious design programme. 1950s influenced garden with a hundred white rabbits let loose. Self-shot majority with DSR 500 over period of 3 weeks
 2002, Director, "Talkback Britain's Best Homes", Channel 4's national search for Britain's best homes
 2002, Director, HBO/Life Network/Living Canada, "90 Days in Hollywood", 13-part observational documentary series about the agonies of a group of desperate young actors as they endure a series of debilitating rejections during Hollywood's notorious Pilot Season. Series Producer: Jonny Clothier
 2002, Director, Tiger Aspect, "Funny You Should Ask", Featured on the street experiments on passers by and science-based comedy sketches and short films. Transmitted on Discovery during its 'Comedy Science' night
 2001, Director, Tiger Aspect, "Toilets", Two half-hour films on the social history of the toilet. Presented by Claudia Winkleman for BBC Choice. "A Design For Life" and "Weird Sh*t"
 2001, Series Director, HTV Refresh, Co-devised (with director Richard Knew) absurd Saturday youth magazine series, designed for people with hangovers
 2001, Producer/Director, HTV Textured Lives, "Your Song", Pilot for prime-time documentary series. Bringing to life significant musical moments in people's lives through dramatic reconstruction and interviews
 2000, Director, Boomerang Garej, (see below)
 1999, Director, Boom Boom Mancini, "Super Model Human", Music Video for Almo Sound signed band
 1999, Producer/Director, Boomerang Garej, Music videos, shot on 16 mm film and Digi Beta for up-and-coming bands. Half-hour show included interviews, profiles and music-related items
 1998, Director, Super Furry Animals, "Ice Hockey Hair", Video for the title track from the bands EP. Featured on 'The Chart Show', MTV and TOTP. Reached number 12 in charts. Available on new compilation DVD – Super Furry Animals – "SONGBOOK"
 1997, Writer/Director, Paradiso Films (Puerto Rico), "Portrait of a Journey: Jack Delano", Palfrey wrote and co-directed his first half-hour film for the Smithsonian Institution in Puerto Rico. The project was shown across South America and USA as part of a travelling retrospective on photographer and composer Jack Delano

Industry Awards
 2004 – Winner of the RTS West of England, Best Network Drama/Drama Documentary
 2005 – "Eating Words" nominated for Prix Europa "My Europe" spot
 2006 – "Eating Words" Shortlisted for Celtic Film Festival
 2009 – "Strap-On Owl Beak" Winner of Best Short Comedy Drama at End of The Pier International Film Festival
 2009 – "Strap-On Owl Beak" Winner of Best Sound Design at End of The Pier International Film Festival

References

External links

 
 Samples of Daf Palfrey's videos
 Ten Pence (Daf Palfrey's company) website
 Up-to-date Daf Palfrey's online CV

British television directors
Living people
1973 births
Alumni of Camberwell College of Arts